John Walter (23 February 1776 – 28 July 1847) was an English newspaper editor and politician. He was the son of John Walter, the founder of The Times, and succeeded his father as the newspaper's second editor.

Biography
Walter was educated at Merchant Taylors' School and Trinity College, Oxford. About 1798 he was associated with his elder brother in the management of his father's business, and in 1803 became not only sole manager, but also editor of The Times.

Walter expressed his opposition to the administration of William Pitt the Younger, which cost him government advertisements and the loss of his appointment as printer to the Customs. It also brought the hostility of officials. When the King of Portugal sent him, via the Portuguese ambassador, a service of gold plate, he returned it.

Walter insisted on the anonymity of those whom he hired. From about 1810, he delegated to others editorial supervision, first to Sir John Stoddart, then to Thomas Barnes, and in 1841 to John Thadeus Delane, though never the ultimate direction of policy.

In 1830, Walter purchased an estate called Bearwood at Sindlesham in Berkshire where he built a house, afterwards rebuilt by his son. He was appointed High Sheriff of Berkshire the same year. Two years later, he was elected to Parliament for the county, and retained his seat till 1837, as a member of the Whigs. In 1841 he was returned to Parliament for Nottingham, but was unseated the following year on petition. He was twice married, and by his second wife, Mary Smythe, had a family. His eldest son, John, also worked in the newspaper. He died in London on 28 July 1847. The Walter Fountain was erected in Nottingham by his son in 1866 in his memory.

References

External links 
 

1776 births
1847 deaths
People from Winnersh
People educated at Merchant Taylors' School, Northwood
British male journalists
Members of the Parliament of the United Kingdom for Berkshire
19th-century British newspaper publishers (people)
High Sheriffs of Berkshire
Walter family
UK MPs 1832–1835
UK MPs 1835–1837
UK MPs 1837–1841
UK MPs 1841–1847
The Times people